Sunnyside Township may refer to:

Sunnyside Township, Wilkin County, Minnesota
Sunnyside Township, Pennington County, South Dakota

See also
Sunnyside (disambiguation)

Township name disambiguation pages